Khalil Shakir (born February 3, 2000) is an American football wide receiver for the Buffalo Bills of the National Football League (NFL). He played college football at Boise State.

High school career
Shakir attended Vista Murrieta High School in Murrieta, California. He committed to Boise State University to play college football.

College career
Shakir appeared in 10 games with one start as a true freshman at Boise State in 2018. He had 16 receptions for 170 yards with one receiving touchdown and one rushing. As a sophomore in 2019, he started five of 14 games, recording 63 receptions for 872 yards with six receiving touchdowns and three rushing touchdowns. Shakir started all seven games his junior year in 2020 and had 52 receptions for 719 yards and six touchdowns. Shakir returned to Boise State for his senior season in 2021 and caught 77 passes for 1,117 yards and 7 touchdowns.

Professional career

The Buffalo Bills selected Shakir in the fifth round, 148th overall, of the 2022 NFL Draft. Shakir caught his first touchdown pass in Week 5 against the Pittsburgh Steelers in a 38–3 Buffalo victory. In his rookie season, he appeared in 14 games and recorded 10 receptions for 161 receiving yards and one receiving touchdown.

NFL career statistics

Regular season

Postseason

References

External links
 Buffalo Bills bio
Boise State Broncos bio

Living people
People from Murrieta, California
Players of American football from California
Sportspeople from Riverside County, California
American football wide receivers
Boise State Broncos football players
2000 births
Buffalo Bills players